The 1871 Tamworth by-election was fought on 28 March 1871.  The byelection was fought due to the elevation to the peerage of the incumbent MP of the Liberal Party, Henry Bulwer.  It was won by the Liberal candidate John Peel.

References

1871 in England
Politics of Tamworth, Staffordshire
1871 elections in the United Kingdom
By-elections to the Parliament of the United Kingdom in Staffordshire constituencies
19th century in Staffordshire